The Cabra is a river in northern Spain flowing through the Autonomous Community of Asturias.

 Beginning: Pico Arenas, on the border between the municipalities of Llanes and Ribadedeva.
 River mouth: Bay of Biscay, in the Playa de la Franca.
 Major tributaries, rivers of Ubrade, the Garn and Aíjo.
 Towns going through: The Borbolla, Bojes.

References

Rivers of Spain
Rivers of Asturias